SS Monterey was a luxury ocean liner launched on 10 October 1931. The ship was completed April 1932 and is shown in registers as a 1932 ship. Monterey was identical to Mariposa and very similar to Lurline. During World War II Monterey was used as a troopship operated by Matson as agents of the War Shipping Administration (WSA). Monterey was a large, fast transport capable of sailing independently and was allocated to serving Army troop transport requirements. The ship was involved in an attack on a convoy near Cape Bougaroun.

Career with Matson Lines
Monterey was built to promote travel to Hawaii and for Pacific Ocean liner service including regular stops in ports along the West Coast of the United States, Samoa, Fiji, New Zealand and Australia. On 12 May 1932 she took 83 passengers from New York City to the West Coast on a positioning cruise. Her maiden voyage officially began 3 June 1932 in San Francisco, California after which she made stops in Los Angeles, Honolulu, Auckland, Pago Pago, Suva, Sydney and Melbourne. She scored a public relations triumph when she carried much-appreciated supplies to the Bear of Oakland on Byrd's second expedition to the South Pole.

War service
In World War II Monterey served as a fast troop carrier, often operating alone so she would not be slowed by formation navigation in a convoy. The United States Maritime Commission chartered her in 1941 before the US declaration of war to carry 150 Chinese, Korean and Japanese missionaries and stranded US citizens back to San Francisco. Once home, she was quickly refitted to hold 3,500 soldiers. The ship was delivered to WSA by Oceanic Steamship Company, a Matson entity, 3 December 1941 at San Francisco. On 16 December 1941 she steamed to Hawaii with 3,349 fresh troops, returning with 800 casualties of the attack on Pearl Harbor.

War voyages
 1941 With urgent need to reinforce Hawaii the Army pushed loading two fast ships, Monterey and Matsonia with troops, aircraft and ammunition in hopes of their sailing independently by 13 December. The Navy opposed any unescorted convoys and, despite Army arguments at the highest levels, the ships were delayed until the 16th when Monterey, Matsonia and Lurline sailed under escort.
 6 January 1942 San Diego to Pago Pago filled to capacity with Marines, arrived 19 January.
 17 February 1942 San Francisco to Brisbane with 4,000 Army troops; convoy with Matsonia and Mormacsea
 9 March 1942 arrived Brisbane
 22 April 1942 left San Francisco for Adelaide, Panama, Key West
 1 July 1942 New York to Glasgow with 5,800 troops
 6 August 1942 New York to Glasgow with 6,000 troops
 27 August 1942 Glasgow to New York, arrived 5 September 1942
 2 November 1942 convoy New York to Casablanca, arrived 16 November 1942
 14 January 1943 left New York in a convoy to Casablanca; arrived 25 January
 5 March 1943 New York to Casablanca
 1 April 1943 sailed alone to Casablanca; arrived 12 April
 29 April 1943 New York to Casablanca
 2 June 1943 New York to Panama
 26 June 1943 San Francisco to Brisbane, Panama
 1943 New York to Brazil
 21 August 1943 New York to Oran with the highest number of soldiers for a Matson ship: 6,855. Traveled in convoy.
 8 October 1943 New York to Liverpool with 6,747 troops; on to Gibraltar and Naples in convoy of 43 ships.
 The voyage to Naples was her first taste of combat. On 6 November 1943 in an action off Cape Bougaroun,  Algeria, 25 aircraft attacked the convoy. Monterey shot down an enemy bomber which passed over the ship and tore away the radio mast before crashing into the ocean. In convoy, the Grace Line troopship Santa Elena was torpedoed and began to sink. Monterey rescued 1,675 using her boats and nets, taking the survivors to Naples.
 July 1944 Milne Bay to Oro Bay; ran aground, troops offloaded, ship refloated with the tide
 21 Sept 1944 San Francisco to Oro Bay, New Guinea transporting WAC's 
 20 January 1945 left San Francisco with US and Canadian troops, as well as Royal Air Force personnel, for New Guinea
 4 February 1945 arrived Finschafen Harbor, New Guinea
 16 February 1946 took Australian war brides from Sydney to San Francisco, stopping along the way at Suva, Fiji and Honolulu, Hawaii.

Post-war name changes
On 26 September 1946 the Monterey arrived at Bethlehem-Alameda Shipyard in Alameda, California for refitting and return to passenger service with Matson. Money ran out on the project after 30% of the work had been completed. For five years she sat idle in Alameda, then was purchased by the US Government in August 1952. She was towed to the mothball fleet in nearby Suisun Bay.

Monterey to Matsonia
Meanwhile, Matson was enjoying fair post-war success with Lurline and was looking to expand their passenger operation once more. Matson had a C4 "Mariner" class vessel undergoing conversion to a cruise ship for the Oceania and Australasia region; this ship was originally named Free State Mariner but Matson had renamed her Monterey. Matson bought the old mothballed SS Monterey back from the US Government on 3 February 1956 and had to come up with a new name for her: she was rechristened SS Matsonia, replacing their earlier Matsonia which had been sold to Home Lines in 1954 and subsequently renamed.  The new Matsonia (ex-Monterey) first sailed from New York to San Francisco on 22 May 1957 to team up with her sister Lurline on the San Francisco – Los Angeles – Honolulu run.

Matsonia to Lurline
Within five years, profits from passenger service had fallen to the point where Matson decided to anchor Matsonia indefinitely in San Francisco Bay. Sister ship Lurline continued to operate but suffered a major turbine problem in February 1963; one that would require costly repairs. Instead of repairing Lurline, Matson sold the well-loved ship to Chandris Lines to be rechristened Ellinis. Stung by poor public opinion regarding the maneuver, Matson rechristened the former Matsonia (ex-Monterey) as the new Lurline on 6 December 1963 and returned her to service.

Lurline to Britanis
By 1970, passenger receipts were down so low that Matson chose to cease passenger liner service altogether. On 25 June 1970, Lurline arrived in San Francisco to be sold to Chandris Lines. Five days later she steamed under new ownership out of the Golden Gate toward Piraeus with the new name Britanis with radio callsign SZWE (later HPEN).

Service with Chandris Lines
At Piraeus, Britanis was greatly modified to hold 1,655 passengers, mainly by subdividing existing cabins and converting cargo holds to new cabin areas. She re-entered service on 21 February 1971 under the Chandris 'Fantasy Cruises' division, leaving Southampton bound for Sydney and back; a regular round-trip she would make for three years. In 1974 she saw service as a cruise ship in the Caribbean during winter and Europe during the summer. In May 1982 Britanis cruised between New York and Bermuda with a smaller capacity of 1,200 passengers.

In winter 1983–1984, Britanis sailed from Miami to the Caribbean, then sailed from New York in the summer. A major overhaul in 1986 included parts from her sister Ellinis (ex-Lurline), some of which went to Ellinis from Homeric (ex-Mariposa) when Homeric was scrapped in 1974. At this point, parts from three sister ships were now bound together in Britanis. The refit gave Britanis eight years of Caribbean cruising until 19 November 1994.

US Government charter
Britanis was chartered by the US Government in 1994 as a floating barracks for military personnel at Guantanamo Bay, Cuba. She suffered minor damage from an electrical fire, was repaired at US Government expense, then laid up at Tampa, Florida in late 1996.

Final years
Chandris opted to sell Britanis as part of a plan to cease cruise line operations for Fantasy Cruises and further invest in their newer Celebrity Cruises brand. The ship was maintained in anchorage until 24 January 1998 when she was sold to AG Belofin Investments of Liechtenstein and renamed Belofin-1.
On June 9, 1999, the SF Chronicle reported that the ship may be turned into a hotel at the San Francisco Bay.

Her new owners intended to recoup their investment by selling the ship to scrappers, but a downturn in steel prices held them up for more than a year. On 3 July 2000, Belofin-1 was towed by the Ukrainian tug Iribis out of Tampa Bay with the former CN Marine ferry MV Bluenose lashed to her port side. The ships were bound for ship breakers in India, but Bluenose ended up going to Mexico. Belofin-1 apparently began taking on water and listing during the voyage but nobody was on board to correct the list.

In popular culture 

In the Earle Stanley Gardner novel The Case of the Stuttering Bishop (1936), the titular character is revealed to have traveled from Australia to San Francisco aboard the Monterey.  The ship's name was retained for the motion picture adaptation the year following the novel's publication.

The song "Bridal Train", released in 2004, is about the war brides who travelled on the Monterey in 1946, and refers to the ship by name in the opening lines.

Footnotes

See also 
 SS Mariposa (1931)
 SS Malolo (1926)
 SS Lurline (1932)
 SS Manoa (1913)

References

Further reading

External links
 Ocean Liner Virtual Museum: S.S. Monterey 1932
 Chandris Lines Britanis
 Britanis SS (1970~1998) Belofin I SS (+2000) at Wreck Site
 Britanis at ssMaritime

1931 ships
Maritime incidents in 2000
Ocean liners
Ships built in Quincy, Massachusetts
Shipwrecks in the Atlantic Ocean
Cruise ships of the United States
Troop ships of the War Shipping Administration